"Days Turn Blue to Gray" is a song by American heavy metal band Machine Head from the album Through the Ashes of Empires. It was released as a single in 2004.

Details
The single was only made available through mail order from the UK or at Machine Head gigs during their 2004 UK tour. "Seasons Wither" was previously not available outside of North America. "The Rage to Overcome" was played at the 10th anniversary show of Burn My Eyes in Philadelphia, Pennsylvania, for the first time in over five years.

Track listing

UK CDs
 "Days Turn Blue to Gray" – 4:25
 "Seasons Wither" – 6:14
 "The Rage to Overcome" (Live) – 4:45

UK 7" vinyl
 "Days Turn Blue to Gray" – 5:29
 "Seasons Wither" – 6:14

UK promo
 "Days Turn Blue to Gray" – 4:25
 "Seasons Wither" (Edit) – 6:14

Personnel
Robb Flynn – lead vocals, rhythm guitar
Adam Duce – bass, backing vocals
Dave McClain – drums
Phil Demmel – lead guitar

Charts

References

Machine Head (band) songs
2004 singles
2003 songs
Roadrunner Records singles
Songs written by Robb Flynn
Songs written by Dave McClain (drummer)
Songs written by Phil Demmel